Nikonovo is a rural locality (a selo) in Parizhskokommunskoye Rural Settlement, Verkhnekhavsky District, Voronezh Oblast, Russia. The population was 548 as of 2010. There are 6 streets.

Geography 
Nikonovo is located 36 km southwest of Verkhnyaya Khava (the district's administrative centre) by road. Uglyanets is the nearest rural locality.

References 

Rural localities in Verkhnekhavsky District